Xinnian is Coming – Uproar of Chuxi is a 2015 Chinese animated fantasy adventure film directed by Yu Mingliang, Yang Xiaojun and Liang Donglong. The film was released on February 19, 2015.

Voice cast
Zhao Shuting
Fu Jie
Yi Xiaoyin
Chen Zhao
Liang Xiaoqiang
Ma Yufei
Gong Dafang
Li Mi
Zhu Xiaoni

Reception
By February 19, the film has earned  at the Chinese box office.

References

2015 animated films
2015 films
2010s fantasy adventure films
Chinese fantasy adventure films
Animated adventure films
Chinese animated fantasy films
2010s Mandarin-language films